Skyport Airport  is a public use airport located three nautical miles (6 km) north of the central business district of Cornelius, a city in Washington County, Oregon, United States. It is privately owned and managed by V. D. Putman.

Facilities and aircraft 
It has one runway designated 16/34 with a turf and gravel surface measuring 2,000 by 45 feet (610 x 14 m).

For the 12-month period ending February 24, 2010, the airport had 2,000 general aviation aircraft operations, an average of 166 per month. At that time there were 3 aircraft based at this airport, all single-engine.

References

External links 
 Aerial image as of 12 June 2002 from USGS The National Map
 

Airports in Washington County, Oregon
Cornelius, Oregon
Privately owned airports